Jagrup Brar is a Canadian politician. He is a Member of the Legislative Assembly (MLA) in British Columbia, representing the riding of Surrey-Panorama Ridge from 2004 to 2009, then Surrey-Fleetwood from 2009 to 2013 and since 2017. A member of the British Columbia New Democratic Party (BC NDP), he has served as the province's Minister of State for Trade since 2022.

Background
Born in Bathinda District, Punjab, India, Brar was part of the India men's national basketball team. He moved to Canada to study at the University of Manitoba, where he received a Master's degree in Public Administration. He then moved to Surrey, British Columbia, where he worked in career and entrepreneurship development for non-profit organizations, including as executive director of the Surrey Self Employment and Entrepreneur Development Society (SEEDS).

He has two children with wife Rajwant.

Political career
He first entered politics by running as the NDP candidate in the October 2004 by-election for the riding of Surrey-Panorama Ridge, triggered by the resignation of BC Liberal MLA Gulzar Cheema. He won the by-election with 6,740 votes (53.59%), defeating Liberal candidate Mary Polak to become a member of British Columbia's 37th Legislative Assembly. He was re-elected to the legislature by winning 11,553 votes (53.17%) in the 2005 provincial election, and served as opposition deputy caucus chair and opposition critic for public safety and the Solicitor General in the 38th Legislative Assembly.

With the NDP reserving the Surrey-Panorama riding for a female candidate in the 2009 provincial election, Brar instead contested the newly established riding of Surrey-Fleetwood, winning the seat by 1,992 votes. He was named critic for small business by NDP leader Adrian Dix in April 2011.

In early 2012 Brar participated in the Raise the Rates MLA Welfare Challenge by living on $610 for one month, the standard wage given to welfare recipients in B.C. at the time. Brar lived in a small room in Vancouver's Downtown Eastside for part of the month-long challenge. He lost 26 pounds during the event and reported feeling constantly hungry and his mind "fuzzy" due to a lack of adequate nutrition and sleep. He kept a blog of his experiences and the media exposure surrounding the event significantly raised public awareness of welfare rates in B.C.

In August 2012, Brar was criticized by Liberal MLA Bill Bennett for praising Cuba's health and education system on a Punjabi radio station after a holiday in the communist country.

He was defeated in the 2013 provincial election by BC Liberal candidate Peter Fassbender by 200 votes. He then ran for president of the BC NDP, but lost to Craig Keating at the November 2013 party convention.

In the 2017 provincial election Brar defeated Fassbender in a re-match, then won re-election in 2020. He was acclaimed as caucus chair for the governing NDP on November 10, 2021, replacing outgoing chair Bob D'Eith.

On December 7, 2022 he was named Minister of State for Trade by Premier David Eby.

Electoral record

References

External links

Legislative Assembly of British Columbia - MLA: Hon. Jagrup Brar

Year of birth missing (living people)
Living people
British Columbia New Democratic Party MLAs
Members of the Executive Council of British Columbia
Indian emigrants to Canada
People from Bathinda district
People from Surrey, British Columbia
University of Manitoba alumni
21st-century Canadian politicians
Canadian politicians of Indian descent